Bokong is a community council located in the Thaba-Tseka District of Lesotho. Its population in 2006 was 7,283.

Villages
The community of Bokong includes the villages of Chaena, Fukhumela, Ha Joele, Ha K'henene, Ha Khoaisi, Ha Khunong, Ha Mafosa, Ha Mahooana, Ha Makhangoa, Ha Makhangoa (Manganeng), Ha Makhona, Ha Makhuoeng, Ha Malimola, Ha Mantsi, Ha Maphike, Ha Mikhane, Ha Mokati, Ha Mothepu, Ha Nkhunyane, Ha Ramarebotse, Ha Ramokoatsi, Ha Rampai, Ha Sepiriti, Ha Suoane (Liontong), Ha Suoane (Manganeng), Ha Suoane (Matebeleng), Ha Suoane (Phahameng), Katse, Khohlo-Ntšo, Khokhoba, Letsatseng, Linkoaneng, Makhoabeng, Mokurutlung, Sephareng, Spear and Thabaneng.

References

External links
 Google map of community villages

Populated places in Thaba-Tseka District
Thaba-Tseka District